LA-14 is a constituency of Azad Kashmir Legislative Assembly which is currently represented by former journalist Mushtaq Minhas of Pakistan Muslim League (N). It covers the area of Western Bagh Tehsil in Bagh District of Azad Kashmir, Pakistan.

Election 2016

elections were held in this constituency on 21 July 2016.

Bagh District
Azad Kashmir Legislative Assembly constituencies